Ziaeddin Shademan (27 November 1923 – 12 March 2009) was an Iranian basketball player. He competed in the men's tournament at the 1948 Summer Olympics.

See also
List of mayors of Tehran

References

1923 births
2009 deaths
Iranian men's basketball players
Olympic basketball players of Iran
Basketball players at the 1948 Summer Olympics
Place of birth missing
20th-century Iranian people
21st-century Iranian people